The Nedlands Masters was a professional golf tournament in Australia, held at the Nedlands Golf Club in Nedlands, Perth, Western Australia. It was first played in 1947, again in 1950, and then annually from 1962. Like the Masters Tournament, the winner of the tournament was presented with a green jacket.

Though not always an official PGA Tour of Australasia event it was on the Order of Merit in the mid-1980s.

Winners 
Note: this list is incomplete

References 

Golf tournaments in Australia
Annual sporting events in Australia
1947 establishments in Australia
2015 disestablishments in Australia